The 2017–18 EHF Cup was the 37th edition of the EHF Cup, the second most important European handball club competition organised by the European Handball Federation (EHF), and the sixth edition since the merger with the EHF Cup Winners' Cup.

Team allocation

Teams
The labels in the parentheses show how each team qualified for the place of its starting round:
TH: Title holders
1st, 2nd, 3rd, 4th, 5th, 6th, etc.: League position
CW: Domestic cup winners
CL QS: Losers from the Champions League qualification stage.

Round and draw dates
The schedule of the competition was as follows (all draws were held at the EHF headquarters in Vienna, Austria):

Qualification stage
The qualification stage consists of three rounds, which are played as two-legged ties using a home-and-away system. In the draws for each round, teams were allocated into two pots, with teams from Pot 1 facing teams from Pot 2. The winners of each pairing (highlighted in bold) qualified for the following round.

For each round, teams listed first played the first leg at home. In some cases, teams agreed to play both matches at the same venue.

Round 1
A total of 30 teams entered the draw for the first qualification round, which was held on Tuesday, 18 July 2017. The draw seeding pots were composed as follows:

The first legs were played on 1–3 and 8–9 September and the second legs were played on 2-3 and 9–10 September 2017.

Notes

1 Both legs were hosted by Talent Robstav M.A.T. Plzeň.
2 Both legs were hosted by RK Partizan 1949 Tivat.
3 Both legs were hosted by SL Benfica.
4 Both legs were hosted by HC Ohrid 2013.
5 Both legs were hosted by Maccabi Srugo Rishon LeZion.
6 Both legs were hosted by Handball Esch.

Round 2

Notes

1 Both legs were hosted by FC Porto.
2 Both legs were hosted by HC Dobrogea Sud Constanța.
3 A special penalty shoot-out was hosted by St. Petersburg HC due to refereeing mistakes. FH won 4-3.
4 Both legs were hosted by Pfadi Winterthur.
5 Both legs were hosted by Balatonfüredi KSE.

Round 3

Group stage

Draw and format
The draw of the EHF Cup group stage took place on Thursday, 30 November 2017. The 16 teams allocated into four pots were drawn into four groups of four teams.

In each group, teams play against each other home-and-away in a round-robin format. The matchdays are 10–11 February, 17–18 February, 24–25 February, 3–4 March, 24–25 March, and 31 March–1 April 2018.

If two or more teams are equal on points on completion of the group matches, the following criteria are applied to determine the rankings (in descending order):
number of points in matches of all teams directly involved;
goal difference in matches of all teams directly involved;
higher number of plus goals in matches of all teams directly involved;
goal difference in all matches of the group;
higher number of plus goals in all matches of the group;

If no ranking can be determined, a decision shall be obtained by drawing lots. Lots shall be drawn by the EHF, if possible in the presence of a responsible of each club.

Seeding
On 27 November 2017, EHF announced the composition of the group stage seeding pots:

Group A

Group B

Group C

Group D

Ranking of the second-placed teams
Because the German side SC Magdeburg, the organizers of the Final 4 tournament, finished on top of their group they qualified directly to the final tournament and only the top three second-placed teams qualified to the quarter-finals.  The ranking of the second-placed teams was determined on the basis of  the team's results in the group stage.

Knockout stage

Quarter-finals
The draw for the quarter-final pairing was held on Tuesday 3 April at 11:00 hrs in the EHF headquarters in Vienna. The first leg was scheduled for 21 and 22 April and the second leg followed one week later.

Matches

Saint-Raphaël won 67–63 on aggregate.

Füchse Berlin won 45–44 on aggregate.

Frisch Auf Göppingen won 61–54 on aggregate.

Final four

The sixth edition of the EHF Cup Finals in 2018 was hosted by SC Magdeburg after the EHF Executive Committee decided to award the hosting rights to the German club at its meeting on 16 December in Hamburg. The tournament took place on 19 and 20 May 2018.
The draw was held on 2 May 2018 in Magdeburg, Germany at 11:00.

Semifinals

Third place game

Final

Top goalscorers

See also
2017–18 EHF Champions League
2017–18 EHF Challenge Cup
2017–18 Women's EHF Cup

References

External links
EHF Cup (official website)

EHF Cup seasons
EHF Cup
EHF Cup